The Abbey School is a private selective day school for girls, in Reading, Berkshire, England.

Overview
The Abbey School provides education for girls aged 3 to 18 years. The school is based in the centre of Reading, on Kendrick Road. The current Head is Will le Fleming. In 2006, the school had just over 1,000 students throughout the school, from Junior to Sixth Form. The school became an International Baccalaureate World School in 2008. In 2020, the IB cohort averaged 39.6 points, compared to the global average of 30.

Founded in 1887, the school moved to its present site in 1905 under the leadership of headmistress Helen Musson.

Notable alumnae include the novelist and social activist Brigid Brophy, the novelist Elizabeth Taylor the educationalist Baroness Brigstocke,
and the historian Lucy Worsley.
Around 100 years before the school was founded in 1887, the novelist Jane Austen briefly attended Reading Ladies' Boarding School within the Abbey Gateway, which is commemorated by, and incorporated into, the Abbey School's crest.
In 2017, HRH The Countess of Wessex visited the school as part of their 130th anniversary celebrations.

History
The school was founded in 1887, named Reading High School, replacing the privately owned Blenheim House Ladies' School. It was located at London Road (in the building which became the Gladstone Club). The Church Schools Company, instrumental in founding the school, felt that Reading, with its growing population reaching 60,000, was in need of a new school. The school aimed to provide high quality education with a Christian ethos at an affordable price. When founded, the school had an enrolment of 40 girls, which steadily increased to 120 by 1902.

In 1905, the school moved to its current Kendrick Road site. On 16 March 1905 William Methuen Gordon Ducat, the Archdeacon of Berkshire, laid the foundation stone of the school, which featured the inscription, "In aedificationem corporis Chris". This motto, taken from Ephesians IV:12, can still be seen on the school's crest and promotional t-shirts. The new site was a vast improvement on the old site: there were six classrooms, a hall and space for playing fields.

The school changed its name to The Abbey School in 1913, after parting from the Church Schools' Company. The name was chosen to commemorate a former Reading school dating from 1835, which was based in the Abbey Gateway. A previous school in the Abbey Gateway operating in the 18th-century, named Reading Ladies’ Boarding School, included Jane Austen among its pupils. The Abbey is now a day school, after ceasing to accept boarding pupils in 1946, and was a direct grant (C. of E.) grammar school in the 1950s .

As of 2006, roughly 45% of entrants in the Upper Third (year 7) came from the Junior School. Also, students from other schools in Berkshire attended.

Reports
As an independent school, Ofsted do not perform inspections of the school. However, Ofsted have inspected the Early Years Centre. The independent schools Inspectorate performed an inspection on the whole school in 2002. In 2004, Ofsted inspected the Early Years Centre only, that is, from ages 3 to 5.  The Good Schools Guide produced a report on the Abbey in 2005.

Notable former pupils

Joyce Baird, trade union leader
Baroness Brigstocke, High Mistress of St Paul's Girls' School
Brigid Brophy, novelist, essayist, feminist
Jenni Falconer, television presenter
Amy Flaxman, scientist, working on ChAdOx1 nCoV-19 at the Jenner Institute, University of Oxford (Oxford AstraZeneca COVID-19 vaccine)
Kate Humble, television presenter
Joanna Kennedy, civil engineer
Miranda Krestovnikoff, presenter of BBC TV 'Coast'
Krissi Murison, editor of the New Musical Express (NME)
Claire Taylor, cricketer
Elizabeth Taylor, author
Sally Taylor, television presenter (BBC South Today)
Minette Walters, novelist
Lucy Worsley, historian, author, curator and television presenter

See also
Reading Girls' School
Reading Abbey Girls' School

References

External links
 Official website
 Abbey School Parents Association website
 Abbey School Reading Old Girls' Association
 Profile by the independent Schools Council
 Profile at The Good Schools Guide

Educational institutions established in 1887
Private schools in Reading, Berkshire
Girls' schools in Berkshire
1887 establishments in England
Member schools of the Girls' Schools Association
International Baccalaureate schools in England